William Medardo Chiroque Távara (born March 10, 1980, in Morropón Province, Peru) is a  Former Peruvian footballer who plays as a striker or winger . He was part of the Peru squad that won the bronze medal in the 2011 Copa America.

Playing career

Club
Chiroque began his career at Alianza Atletico of Sullana where he was the team's top scorer, won the 2003 Torneo Clausura and played in the 2004 and 2005 Copa Sudamericana.

International
Chiroque has been capped thirteen times by the Peru national football team, first on 28 April 2004 in a friendly match against Chile, and scored his first international goal on 23 July 2011 in a 4–1 victory against Venezuela in the 2011 Copa America Third Place Match.

A talented player with great striking and dribbling abilities, Chiroque was named Man of the Match played between Peru and Chile during the group stage of the 2011 Copa America, on 12 July 2011.

International goals
Scores and results list Peru's goal tally first.

Honours

Club
Sporting Cristal
 Clausura: 2005
 Torneo Descentralizado (1):  2005

Juan Aurich
 Torneo Descentralizado (1): 2011

Country 
Peru national team
Copa America: Bronze medal 2011

References

External links
William Chiroque at the Juan Aurich official website

1980 births
Living people
People from Piura Region
Association football forwards
Association football wingers
Peruvian footballers
Peru international footballers
Alianza Atlético footballers
Sporting Cristal footballers
Cienciano footballers
Juan Aurich footballers
Club Deportivo Universidad César Vallejo footballers
Peruvian Primera División players
2011 Copa América players